Heath Ledger was an Australian film actor whose career lasted more than 16 years. Ledger received acclaim for his acting in the Australian crime film Two Hands (1999), receiving nominations at the Australian Film Institute (AFI) and Film Critics Circle of Australia in the categories for Best Actor. After starring in the 2001 films A Knight's Tale and Monster's Ball, Ledger was cast as the title character in the 2003 biographical film Ned Kelly for which he received his second AFI and Film Critics Circle award nominations.

Ledger's breakthrough performance as Ennis Del Mar in the 2005 film adaptation of Brokeback Mountain earned him nominations for an Academy Award, a BAFTA Award, a Golden Globe Award, and a Screen Actors Guild Award, all for Best Actor in a Leading Role. At age 26, he became the ninth-youngest Academy Award Best Actor nominee at the time. In addition, Ledger received recognition from several North American critics' associations, winning the 2005 Las Vegas Film Critics Society, New York Film Critics Circle, Phoenix Film Critics Society, and San Francisco Film Critics Circle awards, as Best Actor. In 2006, he starred in the Australian romantic drama Candy, and was nominated in the category of Best Actor at the AFI, Film Critics Circle, and Inside Film awards ceremony.

Following his death on 22 January 2008, Ledger received numerous posthumous awards and honours. He shared the 2007 Independent Spirit Robert Altman Award with the rest of the ensemble cast for the 2007 biographical film I'm Not There. In his penultimate film performance, Ledger was nominated and awarded for his portrayal of the Joker in The Dark Knight (2008). His wins include an Academy Award, BAFTA, Golden Globe Award, and Screen Actors Guild Award for Best Supporting Actor. Ledger also won the Best Actor International Award at the 2008 AFI Awards ceremony, for which he became the first actor to win an award posthumously. In August 2008, Ledger was posthumously honoured at the Brisbane International Film Festival with the Chauvel Award in recognition of his contribution to the Australian film industry.

Awards and nominations

Academy Awards 
The Academy Awards, or "Oscars" are a set of awards given annually for excellence of cinematic achievements. The awards, organized by the Academy of Motion Picture Arts and Sciences (AMPAS), were first held in 1929 at the Hollywood Roosevelt Hotel. Ledger received one award from two nominations.

Australian Film Institute Awards

Brisbane International Film Festival Awards

British Academy Film Awards 
The British Academy Film Award is an annual award show presented by the British Academy of Film and Television Arts. The awards were founded in 1947 as The British Film Academy, by David Lean, Alexander Korda, Carol Reed, Charles Laughton, Roger Manvell and others. Ledger received one award from two nominations.

Golden Globe Awards

Independent Spirit Awards

Inside Film Awards

People's Choice Awards

Satellite Awards

Saturn Awards

Scream Awards

Screen Actors Guild Awards

Film critic awards

African-American Film Critics Association Awards

Austin Film Critics Association Awards

Boston Society of Film Critics Awards

Broadcast Film Critics Association Awards

Chicago Film Critics Association

Dallas-Fort Worth Film Critics Association Awards

Film Critics Circle of Australia

Florida Film Critics Circle Awards

Iowa Film Critics Awards

Kansas City Film Critics Awards

London Film Critics' Circle

Los Angeles Film Critics Association Awards

New York Film Critics Circle Awards

Online Film Critics Society Awards

San Diego Film Critics Society Awards

San Francisco Film Critics Circle Awards

Santa Barbara International Film Festival Awards

Southeastern Film Critics Association Awards

St. Louis Gateway Film Critics Association Awards

Toronto Film Critics Association Awards

Vancouver Film Critics Circle Awards

Washington D.C. Area Film Critics Association Awards

See also
 List of oldest and youngest Academy Award winners and nominees – Youngest nominees for Best Actor in a Leading Role
List of Australian Academy Award winners and nominees
List of actors with Academy Award nominations
List of actors with two or more Academy Award nominations in acting categories
List of posthumous Academy Award winners and nominees

Notes
Shared with rest of the ensemble cast, director, and casting director of I'm Not There
Shared with rest of the ensemble cast of Brokeback Mountain
Shared with rest of the ensemble cast of The Dark Knight
Shared with Christian Bale

References
General

Specific

External links

Ledger, Heath
Awards